The 1952 Montana gubernatorial election took place on November 4, 1952. Incumbent Governor of Montana John W. Bonner, who was first elected governor in 1948, ran for re-election. He was unopposed in the Democratic primary and moved on to the general election, where he was opposed by J. Hugo Aronson, a State Senator and the Republican nominee. A close election ensued, with Aronson narrowly defeating Bonner to win the first of his two terms as governor.

Democratic primary

Candidates
John W. Bonner, incumbent Governor of Montana

Results

Republican primary

Candidates
J. Hugo Aronson, State Senator
Leonard C. Young

Results

General election

Results

References

Montana
Gubernatorial
1952
November 1952 events in the United States